The Heart of Islam: Enduring Values for Humanity is a 2002 book by the Iranian philosopher Seyyed Hossein Nasr.

See also
 Ideals and Realities of Islam
 Traditional Islam In The Modern World
 The Garden Of Truth

References

Sources
 
 

Seyyed Hossein Nasr
Books about Islam